Andrew Cassese (born ) is an American stage and film actor and musician. Born in New York, Cassese is perhaps best known for starring in the 1984 comedy film Revenge of the Nerds as child prodigy Harold Wormser. In 2007, he starred as Microsoft co-founder Paul Allen in the Philadelphia Theatre Company premiere of Nerds://A Musical Software Satire.

Life and career 
Cassese is an Italian American native of Brooklyn, New York. He attended Patchogue-Medford High School on Long Island, graduating in 1990. Cassese graduated from the NYU Film School in 1995 with three years of production experience with Fox News Channel in New York.

An actor by trade, his credits also include starring roles on Broadway in the productions of Smile and Nine, Tommy Tune's award-winning musical starring Raul Julia. Cassese was also one of the stars of the CBS series, TV 101. Cassese is an accomplished guitarist and singer, and is a member of SAG, AFTRA, and Actor's Equity. In 2017, Cassese joined Robert Carradine, Don Gibb, Curtis Armstrong, Larry B. Scott, Brian Tochi and Julia Montgomery for interviews at the Rhode Island Comic Con. The following year in 2018, Cassese joined Robert Carradine and Don Gibb for interviews at the Niagara Falls Comic Con.

Filmography 
 Revenge of the Nerds (1984)
 Chips Ahoy! (1986) TV commercial
 Hi-C (1985) TV commercial
 The Kingdom Chums: Little David's Adventure (1986) (TV)
 Revenge of the Nerds II: Nerds in Paradise (1987)
 TV 101 (1988) TV Series

Stage 
 Smile 
 Nine
 Eight is NEVER Enough! (2002)
 I Love My Wife (2004)
 Nerds://A Musical Software Satire (2007)

References

External links 
 
 
 Andrew Cassese at Twitter

Living people
American male film actors
American male television actors
American people of Italian descent
Tisch School of the Arts alumni
Year of birth missing (living people)